Lieutenant Colonel Alfred William Wilson  (28 January 1904 – 2 May 1985) was a Scotland international rugby union player. He became the 86th President of the Scottish Rugby Union.

Rugby Union career

Amateur career

Wilson played for Dunfermline.

Provincial career

Wilson captained the Midlands District against North of Scotland District on 7 November 1931 in a 22 - 0 defeat of the northern side.

His form meant he was selected for the combined North of Scotland District side for their match against South of Scotland District on 21 November 1921. The South won the match 30 - 9.

International career

He played for Scotland 3 times in 1931.

Administrative career

He became the 86th President of the Scottish Rugby Union. He served the standard one year from 1972 to 1973. He was appointed CBE in the 1974 Birthday Honours.

References

1904 births
1985 deaths
Scottish rugby union players
Scotland international rugby union players
Commanders of the Order of the British Empire
Presidents of the Scottish Rugby Union
Dunfermline RFC players
North of Scotland (combined side) players
Midlands District players
Rugby union centres